The following tables compare general and technical information for a number of File Transfer Protocol (FTP) clients. Unless otherwise specified in footnotes, comparisons are based on the stable versions without any add-ons, extensions, or external programs.

Free and open-source software

Proprietary freeware

Freeware and commercial editions

Trials of commercial

Commercial

Operating system support
The operating systems the clients can run on.

(CL) Command-Line interface only – no GUI (Graphical user interface)

Protocol support
Information about what internet protocols the clients support. External links lead to information about support in future versions of the clients or extensions that provide such functionality.

See also
 File Transfer Protocol (FTP)
 Comparison of FTP server software packages
 Comparison of SSH clients – many of these, although not listed here, also have an SFTP capability

References

FTP clients